Ugly Creek is a stream in Hickman County, Tennessee, in the United States.

History
The origin of the name Ugly Creek is obscure.

See also
List of rivers of Tennessee

References

Rivers of Hickman County, Tennessee
Rivers of Tennessee